Horace Gates Torbert Jr. (October 7, 1911 – March 24, 2008), also known as Tully Torbert, was an American diplomat. A career Foreign Service Officer, he acted as Chargé d'Affaires ad interim to Hungary from February 1961 to December 1962, Ambassador Extraordinary and Plenipotentiary to Somalia (1963–1965) and Bulgaria (1970–1973).

Gates was born in Washington D.C. on October 7, 1911. He graduated from Yale University and Harvard Business School. He died on March 24, 2008, at the age of 96.

References

1911 births
2008 deaths
Ambassadors of the United States to Bulgaria
Ambassadors of the United States to Hungary
Ambassadors of the United States to Somalia
Harvard Business School alumni
Yale University alumni